KD Singh can refer to:

 K. D. Singh (1922-1978), Indian field hockey player
 KD Singh (cricketer) (born 1981), Indian cricketer
 K. D. Singh (politician) (born 1961), Indian politician